147 (one hundred [and] forty-seven) is the natural number following 146 and preceding 148.

In mathematics
147 is the fourth centered icosahedral number. These are a class of figurate numbers that represent points in the shape of a regular icosahedron or alternatively points in the shape of a cuboctahedron, and are magic numbers for the face-centered cubic lattice. Separately, it is also a magic number for the diamond cubic.

It is also the fourth Apéry number , where 

There are 147 different ways of representing one as a sum of unit fractions with five terms, allowing repeated fractions, and 147 different self-avoiding polygonal chains of length six using horizontal and vertical segments of the integer lattice.

In other fields
147 is the highest possible break in snooker, in the absence of fouls and refereeing errors.

In some traditions, there are 147 psalms. However, current Christian and Jewish traditions list a larger number, leading to the suggestion that some of the psalms in the earlier numbering were split into multiple pieces.

See also
 147 (disambiguation)

References

Integers